Anthony Jordan Malbon (born 14 October 1991) is an English footballer who plays as a forward for  club Eccleshall.

He played for Port Vale between 2009 and 2010, before he signed with Leek Town in summer 2010. He moved on to Newcastle the following year. He also played on loan for both Leek and Newcastle during his time at Vale. In January 2012, he moved up three divisions to play for Conference side Kidderminster Harriers. He was called up to the England C squad in May 2012, but did not win a cap. He was named on the Conference Team of the Year for the 2012–13 season. He switched to Stalybridge Celtic in June 2014, and the joined Kidsgrove Athletic in December 2014. He went on to become the highest goalscorer in the club's history with 159 goals in eight years. He joined Hanley Town in March 2022 and helped the club to win the Midland League Premier Division title at the end of the 2021–22 season, before moving on to Eccleshall in July 2022.

Club career

Early career
Malbon joined Port Vale as a youngster from Derby County in February 2008. He made his Football League debut as a substitute in a 2–1 win over Barnet on 2 May 2009. This came after picking up the club's Youth Player of the Year award the previous week. During the 2008–09 season, he scored 23 goals in the Youth league, and he was voted Youth Player of the Year by the Port Vale management. In February 2010 Malbon Joined Leek Town of the Northern Premier League Division One South for three games on a work experience deal. He scored a brace on his debut. He was offered his first (one year) professional contract at Vale Park at the end of the season.

In the 2010–11 pre-season, manager Micky Adams was pleased with Malbon's development, having witnessed the youngster score in two successive friendlies. However Malbon purposefully avoided a pre-season trip to Ireland by failing to produce a passport as he did not want to take part in the intense running sessions Adams had planned for the squad; this led to him being dropped form the squad by Adams. The "Valiants" denied Leek the opportunity to sign the youngster permanently. In October 2010, Malbon went on loan to Newcastle Town, and impressed enough to earn an extension to the loan. In November 2010, Malbon left Port Vale by mutual consent. He immediately signed with Leek Town, rather than Newcastle Town. His scoring record at Leek attracted attention from Conference clubs. However a trial at Stockport County was ended after manager Ray Mathias was replaced by Dietmar Hamann. Malbon subsequently signed a one-year deal with Newcastle Town.

Kidderminster Harriers
Boasting a prolific scoring record with Newcastle in 2011–12, Malbon was signed by Conference National side Kidderminster Harriers on an eighteen-month contract in January 2012; Kidderminster paid Newcastle Town an initial £7,000 for his services. Manager Steve Burr thanked the "Castle" for allowing the deal, and stated that "he comes across as a lad who really wants the opportunity to come and succeed here, and who is hungry to do that." He made his debut from the bench on 21 January, netting the first goal of a 2–0 win at Alfreton Town. On 28 April, he had to be airlifted from the pitch at Aggborough after he "suffered a significant blow to his head and neck and was unconscious for a couple of minutes."

He signed a new two-year contract in March 2013, having hit a streak of 11 goals in 12 games to send Harriers to the top of the table. Malbon and strike partner Michael Gash finished the 2012–13 season as the division's joint-third highest scorers with 19 goals, helping Kidderminster to secure a play-off place with a second-place finish. At the end of the season he was voted onto the Conference Team of the Year, alongside teammates Lee Vaughan and Josh Gowling. He found goals more difficult to come by in the 2013–14 season as new manager Andy Thorn switched to a one striker system, leaving Malbon to sometimes feature from the bench or in midfield.

Stalybridge Celtic
Malbon signed with Conference North club Stalybridge Celtic after having his contract with Kidderminster Harriers mutually terminated in June 2014. He struggled with depression and only made five appearances, scoring once, before he was released and joined Kidsgrove Athletic in December 2014.

Kidsgrove Athletic
Kidsgrove Athletic finished 20th in the Northern Premier League Division One South in 2014–15, 15th in 2015–16, and 12th in 2016–17. He rejected a move up a division to join Nantwich Town in February 2016. He scored 25 goals for the "Grove" in the 2016–17 season. However he missed large parts of the 2017–18 season due to injury, whilst also began to adapt his game to become more of a target-man forward. Kidsgrove finished tenth in the 2018–19 season, with Malbon scoring 32 goals. He agreed a new two-year deal with the club in March 2020, despite the ongoing coronavirus pandemic in England. At that stage he was on 147 goals for Kidsgrove, making him the highest goalscorer in the club's history. He scored a hat-trick against Chasetown on 6 October 2020 to reach 150 club goals. However both the 2019–20 and 2020–21 seasons were abandoned due to the pandemic. Malbon agreed a new contract with Kidsgrove in May 2021. He scored a club record total of 159 goals during his eight year stay.

Hanley Town
Malbon joined Hanley Town of the Midland League Premier Division in March 2022. The club won the league title at the end of the 2021–22 season.

Eccleshall
In July 2022, Malbon joined North West Counties League Division One South club Eccleshall.

International career
He was called up to the England C squad for the game against Russia on 5 June 2012. He was again called up by Paul Fairclough for the England C game against Bermuda on 10 May 2013. However he never won a cap as he pulled out of both trips to go on 'lad's holidays' to Magaluf and Benidorm; he made an excuse to miss the Russia game and e-mailed Fairclough to inform him he was retired from international duty for the trip to Bermuda.

Career statistics

Honours
Individual
Conference Premier Team of the Year: 2012–13

Hanley Town
Midland League Premier Division: 2021–22

References

1991 births
Living people
Footballers from Stoke-on-Trent
English footballers
England semi-pro international footballers
Association football forwards
Port Vale F.C. players
Leek Town F.C. players
Newcastle Town F.C. players
Kidderminster Harriers F.C. players
Stalybridge Celtic F.C. players
Kidsgrove Athletic F.C. players
Hanley Town F.C. players
Eccleshall F.C. players
English Football League players
National League (English football) players
Northern Premier League players
North West Counties Football League players